Josephine Rebeta Medina (March 20, 1970 – September 2, 2021) was a Filipino table tennis player. Medina represented the Philippines at the 2012 and 2016 Summer Paralympics.

Early career
Medina was influenced to take up table tennis as a sport by her father who used to compete for the Philippines internationally. She was afflicted with poliomyelitis which affected the length of her legs. She competed with able-bodied players as a varsity player during her collegiate studies in order to cope with her family's financial problems.

She managed to qualify for a place at the national table tennis team but was later told she could not compete due to her disabilities.

International career

Medina subsequently competed in tournaments for disabled athletes instead and competed at her first international competition, the 2003 ASEAN Para Games. At the 2008 ASEAN Para Games, Medina achieved the most number of medals among the competitors for the Philippines winning 5 gold medals. She championed the single class 8 and single class 6-10 for the individual events, won the doubles open class 6-10 with Purificacion Mingarine, and the team class 10 with Minnie de Ramos and Mingarine.

Medina won a gold medal at the single class 9 event at the 2014 ASEAN Para Games. In 2015, Medina won gold for the Single Class 7-8 and a bronze in Double Class 10. In 2017, Medina won gold in the Singles Class SF6–8 and a bronze for Team Class TF9-10 with Minnie de Ramos Cadag.

She qualified for the 2018 World Para Table Tennis Championships by participating in qualifying tournaments using her own money for her expenses. After the 2016 Olympics in Rio de Janeiro she won a gold in a tournament in Thailand which was followed by another singles gold medal in a tournament in Las Vegas, Nevada. She garnered a silver and bronze in the 2017 Taichung Open in Taiwan securing qualification for the world para championships.

In March 2018, Medina was reportedly training without a coach for about six months until the Asian Para Games in Indonesia due to lack of time. To compensate for this, she practiced with the men's team of the member colleges of the University Athletic Association of the Philippines.

Paralympics
She competed at the 2012 Summer Paralympics but came short of achieving a podium finish. At the 2016 Summer Paralympics she won a bronze medal after defeating Juliane Wolf of Germany.

Personal life
Medina's father, a former member of the national team, was Josephine's inspiration for taking up table tennis. Her father, who worked in Saudi Arabia last coaching the Royal Saudi Air Force, died in 2004. Medina dedicated her 2016 Summer Paralympic feat to her father.

Medina held a degree in industrial and organizational psychology from the Polytechnic University of the Philippines in Manila.

Medina died on September 2, 2021, at her home at age 51.

References

1970 births
2021 deaths
Filipino table tennis players
Table tennis players at the 2012 Summer Paralympics
Table tennis players at the 2016 Summer Paralympics
Paralympic table tennis players of the Philippines
Medalists at the 2016 Summer Paralympics
Paralympic medalists in table tennis
Paralympic bronze medalists for the Philippines
Polytechnic University of the Philippines alumni
ASEAN ParaGames competitors